The Pine Point Mine is located on the south shore of Great Slave Lake between Hay River to the west and Fort Resolution to the east, in the Northwest Territories of Canada. It produced lead and zinc ores from a Mississippi Valley Type deposit between 1964 and 1988. Most of the mining was done by  open-pit methods. The town of Pine Point was built by the mining company, Cominco, and when the mine closed the town was abandoned and demolished.

History

The Pine Point ore deposit was discovered in the late 19th century by fur traders at Fort Resolution who learned of the lead ores from the natives. A minor staking rush occurred in 1898 when Klondike prospectors heard rumours of silver at the location. There was no silver to be found, and although the lead ore was very rich, it was not feasible to mine the isolated deposit without good transportation to the south.

The first major exploration work was done in 1928–1930 when several short shafts were sunk and a churn drill was brought to the area to drill into the rich ores. That work was halted by the Great Depression. Geological investigation by Cominco after World War II led to new theories of how the ore deposits were hosted, and by 1955 an extensive exploration program had outlined several thousand tons of ore along a  belt.

The Government of Canada built the Great Slave Railway from Grimshaw, Alberta to the mine; construction started in 1962 and was completed in 1964, at which time it was made part of the then-Crown Corporation CN Rail. The railway line was sold by CN Rail to become a short line named the Mackenzie Northern Railway, but was later reacquired by CN Rail.

Official production at the mine commenced in 1965. Cominco built its own townsite which became known as Pine Point. It became a territorial settlement with private businesses, and boasted a population of nearly 2,000 at its peak. When the mine closed in 1988, the single-industry town was forced to close, and the rail spur was removed.

The mine produced and shipped 10,785,000 tons of lead and zinc concentrates/high-grade ores after mining and milling 69,416,000 tons of ore material. Contained metal was approximately 2 million tons of lead and 7 million tons of zinc.

Development since 2000
In the 2000s, Tamerlane Ventures Inc. purchased the mine in the hopes of restarting the operations. The effort failed due to low metal prices at the time and the company filed for bankruptcy. Darnley Bay Resources Ltd. purchased the project for $8 million in December 2016 and hired about 20 staff in neighbouring communities for exploratory drilling and line cutting. The company is expected to invest $154 million into the mine and would employ 320 workers at full capacity. The company highlighted cost savings from the nearby highway and railroad constructed previously for the mine in 1980s as well as the electricity generated from the hydroelectric project from Taltson River.

Geology
The Pine Point deposit is a carbonate hosted lead-zinc ore deposit (Mississippi Valley Type deposit). The ore is localized in solution-collapse (karst) structures where sulfide minerals preferentially replaced some of the carbonate host rocks, dolomite and limestone), of the Presqu'ile Formation. Minerals present include galena, sphalerite, marcasite, pyrite, dolomite, calcite, sulphur and bitumen. The sulfide minerals were probably deposited by hydrothermal fluids that rose along an underlying shear zone.

References

 Bérubé, Y. (1972). An Engineering asse[s]sment of waste water handling procedures, at the Cominco Pine Point mine final report. Laval, Quebec: Centre de recherches sur l'eau, Universite Laval.
 Deprez, P. (1973). The Pine Point Mine and the development of the area south of Great Slave Lake. Winnipeg: Center for Settlement Studies, University of Manitoba.
 Evans, M. S., Klaverkamp, J. F., & Lockhart, L. (1998). Metal studies of water, sediments and fish from the Resolution Bay area of Great Slave Lake studies related to the decommissioned Pine Point Mine. Saskatoon, Sask: National Hydrology Research Institute.
 Norris, A. W., & Uyeno, T. T. (1998). Middle Devonian brachiopods, conodonts, stratigraphy, and transgressive-regressive cycles, Pine Point area, south of Great Slave Lake, District of Mackenzie, Northwest Territories. Ottawa: Natural Resources Canada. 
 Pine Point Mines Limited. (1978). Zinc/lead mining at Pine Point, N.W.T. Pine Point, N.W.T.: The Mines.
 Wilson, J., & Petruk, W. (1985). Quantitative mineralogy of Pine Point tailings. [Ottawa?]: CANMET, Energy, Mines and Resources Canada.

External links

  A web documentary about the town of Pine Point was produced in 2011 by the National Film Board of Canada and The Goggles 
 1926 Ted Nagle and the Pine Point Discovery NWT Historical Timeline, Prince of Wales Northern Heritage Centre
 Former residents of Pine Point have built a website to house photos of the town 

Former mines in Canada
Lead mines in Canada
Mines in the Northwest Territories
Open-pit mines
Underground mines in Canada
Zinc mines in Canada